In the 1959 Mediterranean Games, one of the games played was volleyball. Italy won the men's division. France came 2nd.

Medalists

Standings
Men's competition

External links
 Complete 1959 Mediterranean Games Standings

Volleyball at the Mediterranean Games
1959 in volleyball
Sports at the 1959 Mediterranean Games